El Xupet Negre (The Black Pacifier) is a graffiti artist from Barcelona, Spain, who has painted a black pacifier/dummy logo since 1987.

Influences
His biggest influence was mainly his family, art from all times, graphic design, all information that is around, traffic signs, and brands.

1987
Starting in 1987, El Xupet Negre painted 'Black Dummies' all over the city and everyone wondered who painted it and what was its meaning.

1993
This was the year he began to appear in magazines and in TV in Spain, France, the Netherlands, Germany, and US.

1998
In 1998 he began to paint and sell his pictures on both wood and canvas. Though he still tags, the majority of his work done through painting big old walls in the city (with permission).

Further reading

Street Logos, Tristan Manco, Thames & Hudson, 2004, 

El Xupet Negre, 31 Añons Graffitiando Barcelona Lamono Magazine
El gran mural independentista de Xupet Negre a Terrassa ja llueix, LaTorre, 13 May 2016

References

Year of birth missing (living people)
Living people
Spanish graffiti artists
Place of birth missing (living people)